The year 1643 in science and technology involved some significant events.

Exploration
 January 21 – Abel Tasman discovers the Tonga archipelago.
 December 25 – Captain William Mynors of the British East India Company discovers Christmas Island.

Meteorology
 Evangelista Torricelli invents the mercury barometer.

Births
 January 4 (NS) – Isaac Newton, English physicist (died 1727)
 Jean de Fontaney, French Jesuit mathematician and astronomer (died 1710)
 Pierre Dionis, French surgeon and anatomist (died 1718)

Deaths
 April 9 – Benedetto Castelli, Italian mathematician (born 1578)
 November 3
 John Bainbridge, English astronomer (born 1582)
 Paul Guldin, Swiss mathematician and astronomer (born 1577)
 Sophia Brahe, Danish astronomer (born 1556)
 Gasparo Berti, Italian mathematician, astronomer and physicist (born c. 1600)
 Walter Warner, English scientist (born 1563)

References

 
17th century in science
1640s in science